Chelsea Football Club is a professional association football club based in Fulham, London. Founded in 1905, they were elected to play in The Football League as members of the Second Division. They were promoted into the First Division in the club's second season. Chelsea remained in the Football League, in the First or Second division, until 1992 when clubs in the First Division broke away from The Football League to form the Premier League. The club has remained in the top division of the English football league system since 1989. In their latest spell in the Second Division Chelsea achieved their highest points total achieving 99 in the 1988–89 season. As of the 2017–18 season, the club holds the records for the most clean sheets in a single Premier League season with 25 in 2004–05. Chelsea have been English football champions six times.

Chelsea played their inaugural league fixture as part of the Football League Second Division on 2 September 1905 against Stockport County. Since that game they have faced eighty different sides in league football with their most regular opponent having been Arsenal, whom they have played on 170 occasions since their first meeting on 9 November 1907. They met their most recent different league opponent, Wigan Athletic, for the first time in the 2005–06 FA Premier League season. The club has won 65 of their league matches against Newcastle United which represents the most Chelsea have won against any club. Chelsea have drawn more matches with Manchester United than with any other club, with 52. The side has lost more league games to Liverpool than to any other club, having been defeated by them 70 times in 156 encounters.

Key
 The table includes results of matches played by Chelsea in The Football League (First Division and Second Division) and the Premier League. Wartime matches are regarded as unofficial and are excluded.
 For the sake of simplicity, present-day names are used throughout: for example, results against Small Heath, Woolwich Arsenal and The Wednesday are integrated into the records against Birmingham City, Arsenal and Sheffield Wednesday, respectively.
   Teams with this background and symbol in the "Club" column are competing in the 2021–22 Premier League alongside Chelsea.
   Clubs with this background and symbol in the "Club" column are defunct.
 P = matches played; W = matches won; D = matches drawn; L = matches lost; F = goals for; A = goals against; Win% = percentage of total matches won.
 The columns headed "First" and "Last" contain the first and most recent seasons in which Chelsea played league matches against each opponent.

All-time league record
Statistics correct as of match played on 22 May 2022.

Notes

References
General
 
 
 

Specific

league records by opponent
league records by opponent
English football club league records by opponent